Vittoria Baldino (born 28 May 1988) is an Italian politician and lawyer. She was elected to be a deputy to the Parliament of Italy in the 2018 Italian general election for the Legislature XVIII of Italy.

Career 
Baldino was born in 1988 in Rossano, in the Southern Italy region of Calabria. She graduated in law from the Sapienza University of Rome with a thesis on finance science. Since 2016, she has been practicing in Rome as a lawyer specialized in administrative and urban planning law. In the 2018 general election on 5 March, she was elected to the Italian Parliament to represent the district of Lazio for the Five Star Movement. She was subsequently replaced by Angela Salafia (it) but was subsequently reinstated in a different Lazio district.

In the 2022 Italian general election on 25 September, she was narrowly defeated in the first-past-the-post constituency of Calabria 1 with 35.25% of the vote compared to the 38.12% of the centre-right coalition candidate. She was elected through proportional representation in the same constituency.

References 

1988 births
21st-century Italian women politicians
Deputies of Legislature XVIII of Italy
Five Star Movement politicians
Italian lawyers
Italian politicians
Living people
People from Rossano
Sapienza University of Rome alumni
Women members of the Chamber of Deputies (Italy)